Mustjala Parish was a municipality in Saare County, Estonia. The municipality had a population of 755 (as of 1 January 2009) and covered an area of 235.97 km².

During the administrative-territorial reform in 2017, all 12 municipalities on the island Saaremaa were merged into a single municipality – Saaremaa Parish.

Villages
Jauni - Järise - Kiruma - Kugalepa - Küdema - Liiküla - Liiva - Merise - Mustjala - Ninase - Ohtja - Paatsa - Pahapilli - Panga - Rahtla - Selgase - Silla - Tagaranna - Tuiu - Vanakubja - Võhma

See also
Municipalities of Estonia

References